Baron  was a Japanese diplomat and ambassador to the United States from 1900 to 1909.

Biography
Takahira was born in what is now Ichinoseki city, Iwate prefecture. From relatively modest beginnings, Takahira was to become a graduate of Kaisei Gakkō (the predecessor to Tokyo Imperial University).

Career diplomat
In 1876, he joined the Ministry of Foreign Affairs.  His first posting to the United States in 1879 was as an attaché; and he was promoted to secretary in 1881.  During a return to Asia, he served briefly as chargé d'affaires in Korea and as Consul General in Shanghai, China.  In 1887, he returned to the United States as Consul General in New York City.
Postings in Europe as Minister-Resident to Netherlands and Denmark, and as Minister Plenipotentiary at Rome, Vienna and Bern spanned the years before his 1901 return to Washington, D.C. He then continued as Japan's minister in the United States from 1901 through 1905.

 
Takahira participated in a number of important Japanese-US negotiations.  Takahira was one of the principals of the Japanese delegation negotiating with the Russians to conclude the Treaty of Portsmouth, which ended the Russo-Japanese War.

In 1907, Takahira was named Ambassador to Rome.  The Foreign Ministry called him back to Washington, D.C. in 1908-1909.

As principal negotiator for Japan, his name is commemorated in the 1908 Root-Takahira Agreement, which was intended to ease Japanese-US tension by defining each nation's role in the Pacific arena and China.

Takahira later elevated to danshaku (baron) under the kazoku peerage system, and was appointed to the House of Peers, and subsequently served on the Privy Council.

Honors
 Order of the Sacred Treasure, Grand Cordon.

Hon. Knight Commander of the Order of St. Michael and St. George (KCMG) (20 February 1906)
Grand Cordon of the Order of the Rising Sun (1 April 1906)

Notes

References
 Beasley, W.G. Japanese Imperialism 1894-1945. Oxford: Oxford University Press. 
 Davis, Richard Harding, and Alfred Thayer Mahan. (1905).  The Russo-Japanese war; a photographic and descriptive review of the great conflict in the Far East, gathered from the reports, records, cable despatches, photographs, etc., etc., of Collier's war correspondents  New York: P. F. Collier & Son.  OCLC: 21581015
 Keene, Donald. (2002).  Emperor Of Japan: Meiji And His World, 1852-1912. New York: Columbia University Press.  (cloth) -- 
 Korostovetz, J.J. (1920).  Pre-War Diplomacy The Russo-Japanese Problem. London: British Periodicals Limited.
 MacMurray, John Van Antwerp. (1921).  Treaties and Agreements with and Concerning China, 1894-1919: A Collection. Oxford: Oxford University Press.
 Morris, Edmund. 92002). Theodore Rex. Modern Library; Reprint edition.

External links
 The Museum Meiji Mura

1854 births
1926 deaths
People from Ichinoseki, Iwate
Japanese people of the Russo-Japanese War
Kazoku
Members of the House of Peers (Japan)
Recipients of the Order of the Sacred Treasure
People of Meiji-period Japan
Ambassadors of Japan to the United States
Ambassadors of Japan to Italy
Consuls General of Japan in New York